In enzymology, a 5-oxoprolinase (ATP-hydrolysing) is an enzyme that catalyzes the chemical reaction

ATP + 5-oxo-L-proline + 2 H2O  ADP + phosphate + L-glutamate

The 3 substrates of this enzyme are ATP, 5-oxo-L-proline, and H2O, whereas its 3 products are ADP, phosphate, and L-glutamate.

This enzyme belongs to the family of hydrolases, those acting on carbon-nitrogen bonds other than peptide bonds, specifically in cyclic amides.  The systematic name of this enzyme class is 5-oxo-L-proline amidohydrolase (ATP-hydrolysing). Other names in common use include pyroglutamase (ATP-hydrolysing), oxoprolinase, pyroglutamase, 5-oxoprolinase, pyroglutamate hydrolase, pyroglutamic hydrolase, L-pyroglutamate hydrolase, 5-oxo-L-prolinase, and pyroglutamase.  This enzyme participates in glutathione metabolism.

References

 

EC 3.5.2
Enzymes of unknown structure